The Adventuress of Henrietta Street is a BBC Books original novel written by Lawrence Miles and based on the long-running British science fiction television series Doctor Who. It features the Eighth Doctor, Fitz and Anji.

This novel sees the first named appearance of the villain Sabbath, who subsequently appears in many of the following novels.

External links
The Cloister Library - The Adventuress of Henrietta Street

2001 British novels
2001 science fiction novels
Eighth Doctor Adventures
Novels by Lawrence Miles
The Master (Doctor Who) novels
Faction Paradox